Kishor Shridharbhai Trivedi is an Indian-American computer scientist who is currently the Hudson Chaired Professor in department of electrical and computer engineering at Duke University.

Education 
Kishor S. Trivedi was born in India. He graduated from Indian Institutes of Technology Bombay in 1968 with B.Tech. in electrical engineering.  He received a master's degree in computer science in 1972, and a PhD in computer science both from the University of Illinois at Urbana-Champaign (UIUC)  under supervision of James Evans Robertson and J. Richard Philips.

Career 
Kishor S. Trivedi is currently the Hudson Chaired Professor in department of electrical and computer engineering at Duke University. He has been on the Duke faculty since 1975.

Books 
He wrote three well-known books including the bluebook "Probability and Statistics with Reliability, Queuing and Computer Science Applications", redbook "Performance and Reliability Analysis of Computer Systems: An Example-Based Approach Using the SHARPE Software Package" and whitebook "Queueing Networks and Markov Chains". In addition to these three books, he recently wrote a greenbook "Reliability and Availability Engineering".

Publications 
He has published more than 500 articles in international conferences, journals.

Honors 
He is an Institute of Electrical and Electronics Engineers (IEEE) fellow and a Life fellow of IEEE. He received 2008 IEEE Computer Society Technical Achievement Award “For pioneering contributions to the understanding of the phenomena of software aging and software rejuvenation." He is an elected member of the IFIP Working Group 10.4 on Dependable Computing and Fault-Tolerance.

References 

American electrical engineers
Duke University faculty
Year of birth missing (living people)
Living people
American computer scientists